Shaab Ibb Sports and Cultural Club is a Yemeni football club based in Ibb. The club was established in 1964.

Achievements
Yemeni League: 3
2003, 2004, 2012. 

Yemeni President Cup: 2
2002, 2003.

Yemeni September 26 Cup: 1
2002.

 Yemeni Super Cup: 1
2013

Performance in AFC competitions
AFC Cup: 2 appearances
2004: Group Stage
2013: Group Stage

Current squad

External links
team profile - goalzz.com

Football clubs in Yemen
Association football clubs established in 1964
1964 establishments in Yemen